Uksen Island is a steep-sided, isolated island lying   northeast of Tilley Nunatak, off the coast of Mac. Robertson Land.  It was first mapped by Norwegian cartographers from air photos taken by the Lars Christensen Expedition, 1936–37, and named Uksen (the ox).

See also 
 List of Antarctic and sub-Antarctic islands

Islands of Mac. Robertson Land